Upper Point de Bute is a Canadian rural community in Westmorland County, New Brunswick. Located in the Sackville Parish approximately 7 kilometres northeast of Sackville. It was first settled in 1761 by immigrants from New England and in 1772 by immigrants from England.

History

Notable people
Richard C. Boxall, architect was commissioned to design a Methodist Church for the Point de Bute congregation in 1881.

See also
List of communities in New Brunswick

References

Communities in Westmorland County, New Brunswick